Rubén Cesar Daray (born March 2, 1950 in Buenos Aires province), is a retired Argentine racing driver. He won the TC2000 Championship in 1985.

External links

1950 births
Living people
Argentine racing drivers
Turismo Carretera drivers
TC 2000 Championship drivers
Sportspeople from Buenos Aires Province
20th-century Argentine people